Outback Patrol is a 1952 documentary about the patrol of a policeman in the Northern Territory outback, Constable Robert Darkin, and the various tasks he must perform. The movie has since become a study text in Australian secondary schools.

References

External links

Outback Patrol at National Film and Sound Archive
Interview with Lee Robinson on the making of the film

1952 films
1952 documentary films
Australian short documentary films
Documentary films about law enforcement
Australian black-and-white films
1950s English-language films
1950s short documentary films